Ronald A. Hites is an American chemist, currently a Distinguished Professor at Indiana University, and also a published author. He is a Fellow of the American Chemical Society and the American Association for the Advancement of Science and also founded the Journal of the American Society for Mass Spectrometry.

References

Year of birth missing (living people)
Living people
Indiana University faculty
21st-century American chemists